Ho Kim Fai (born 27 November 1962) is a Hong Kong rower and sprint canoer who competed from the mid-1980s to the early 1990s. At the 1984 Summer Olympics in Los Angeles, she was eliminated in the semifinals of both the K-1 500 m and the K-2 500 m events in canoeing.

Eight years later in Barcelona, Ho finished 15th in the single sculls event.

External links
Sports-Reference.com profile

1962 births
Canoeists at the 1984 Summer Olympics
Hong Kong female canoeists
Hong Kong female rowers
Living people
Olympic canoeists of Hong Kong
Olympic rowers of Hong Kong
Rowers at the 1992 Summer Olympics
Asian Games medalists in rowing
Rowers at the 1994 Asian Games
Asian Games silver medalists for Hong Kong
Medalists at the 1994 Asian Games